This is a list of works by American television personality, musician, composer, actor, comedian, and writer Steve Allen.

Films
 Down Memory Lane (1949)
 The Benny Goodman Story (1956)
 The Big Circus (1959)
 College Confidential (1960)
 Warning Shot (1967)
 Where Were You When the Lights Went Out? (1968)
 The Comic (1969)
 Rich Man, Poor Man (1976)
 Alice in Wonderland (1985 film) (1985)
 The St. Tammany Miracle (1994)

Shows
 Songs for Sale (1950–1952)
 What's My Line? (regular panelist, 1953–1954; frequent guest panelist 1954–1967)
 Jukebox Jury (1953)
 Talent Patrol (1953–1955)
 The Steve Allen Show (1956–61)
 The Tonight Show (1954–1957, NBC)
 The Steve Allen Westinghouse Show (1962–1968)
 I've Got a Secret (1964–1967, 1972–1973)
 The Steve Allen Show (Filmways production, 1968–1969)
 Steve Allen Show (September 29, 1970 – October 21, 1971) KTLA
 Match Game (panelist, 1974)
 Tattletales (panelist, mid-1970s)
 Meeting of Minds (1977–1981, PBS)
 Steve Allen Comedy Hour (1980–1981)
 The Start of Something Big (1985–1986)
 Amen (1991, Lights, Camera, Deacon Season 5 episode 9)
 The Simpsons (1992, "Separate Vocations", 1995, 'Round Springfield")
 Space Ghost Coast to Coast (1997, one episode, Guest)
 Homicide: Life on the Street (1998):  Steve and Jayne appeared as guests (January 16, 1998).
 Sabrina the Teenage Witch (April 3, 1998, Season 2 Episode 21 "Fear Strikes Up a Conversation", Guest)

Songs
 "Theme from Picnic"
 "This Could Be the Start of Something Big"
 "Pretend You Don't See Her, My Heart"
 "The Gravy Waltz"
 "The Saturday Evening Post"
 "Impossible"
 "Cool Yule"

Comedic discography

 Man in the Street (1963) (Signature 1004)
 Funny Fone Calls (1963) (Dot 3472, re-issued as Casablanca 811-366-1-ML)
 More Funny Fone Calls (1963) (Dot 3517, re-issued as Casablanca 811-367-1-ML)

Musical discography
 Steve Allen's All Star Jazz Concert Vol. 1 with Lawson-Haggart Jazz Band, Billy Butterfield Jazz Band (Decca, 1954)
 Steve Allen's All Star Jazz Concert Vol. 2 with Lawson-Haggart Jazz Band, Billy Butterfield Jazz Band (Decca, 1954)
 Music for Tonight (Coral, 1955)
 Jazz for Tonight (Coral, 1955)
 Steve Sings (Coral, 1955)
 The Steve Allen Show (Coral, 1955)
 Allen Plays Allen (Coral, 1956)
 The James Dean Story with Bill Randle (Coral, 1956)
 Steve Allen Plays Benny Goodman (Coral, 1956)
 Romantic Rendezvous with Neal Hefti (Coral, 1957)
 Venetian Serenade (Coral, 1957)
 Terry Gibbs, Captain with Terry Gibbs (Mercury, 1958)
 Steve Allen Plays Hi-Fi Music for Influentials (Coral, 1958)
 The Poetry of Love (Coral, 1958)
 What Is Subud with John Bennett (Hanover, 1958)
 Steve Allen Plays Neal Hefti (Coral, 1958)
 Anthony Plays Allen with Ray Anthony (Capitol, 1958)
 Man On the Street with Tom Poston, Don Knotts, Louis Nye (Signature, 1959)
 The Discovery of Buck Hammer (Hanover, 1959)
 Steve Allen Presents Carole Simpson: Singin' and Swingin'  (Tops, 1959)
 Steve Allen Presents Sandy Warner: Fair & Warner (Tops, 1959)
 Poetry for the Beat Generation with Jack Kerouac (Hanover, 1959)
 Steve Allen at the Roundtable (Roulette, 1959)
 Swingin' & Dancin'  with Gus Bivona (Mercury, 1959)
 Steve Allen Plays (Dot, 1959)
 Around the World (Dot, 1959)
 Monday Nights (Signature, 1960)
 Steve Allen Presents Terry Gibbs at the Piano (Signature, 1960)
 Steve Allen Presents 12 Golden Hits (Dot, 1962)
 Steve Allen Plays Bossa Nova Jazz (Dot, 1963)
 Plays the Piano Greats (Dot, 1963)
 Gravy Waltz and 11 Current Hits! (Dot, 1963)
 Steve Allen Sings (Dot, 1963)
 More (Theme from "Mondo Cane") (Dot, 1963)
 Steve Allen's Funny Fone-Calls (Dot, 1963)
 Some of My Favorites (Hamilton 1964)
 Songs from the Steve Allen TV Show (Dot, 1964)
 Poetry in Piano (Coral, 1964)
 I Play for You (Dot, 1965)
 His Piano & Orchestra (Dot, 1965)
 Cool, Quiet Bossa Nova (Dot, 1967)
 Do the Love with Bob Thiele (ABC, 1967)
 Soulful Brass with Oliver Nelson (Impulse!, 1968)
 A Man Called Dagger (Music from the Original Soundtrack) (MGM 1968)
 Soulful Brass #2 (Flying Dutchman, 1969)
 Soulful Brass #3 (Flying Dutchman, 1971)
 Steve Allen Presents Linda Guymon (Dobre 1978)
 Funny Fone Calls (Casablanca, 1983)
 Steve Allen's More Funny Fone Calls (Casablanca, 1983)
 Alice in Wonderland Original Cast Voice Track Recording (1985)
 Steve Allen Plays Jazz Tonight (Concord Jazz, 1993)

Books

Allen was the credited author of a series of mystery novels "starring" himself and wife Jayne Meadows as amateur detectives.  The first one (The Talk Show Murders) was ghostwritten by Walter J. Sheldon; later volumes were ghostwritten by Robert Westbrook.

 The Talk Show Murders (1982), 
 Murder on the Glitter Box (1989), 
 Murder in Manhattan (1990), 
 Murder in Vegas (1991), 
 The Murder Game (1993), 
 Murder on the Atlantic (1995), 
 Wake Up to Murder (1996), 
 Die Laughing (1998), 
 Murder in Hawaii (1999),

Skeptic magazine
As Allen was a supporter of the scientific skepticism movement, he worked to promote critical thinking, contributing many pieces to the American magazine Skeptic, which is published by the California-based Skeptics Society.

Skeptic Vol. 1, No. 1, "A Tribute to Isaac Asimov" (with Harlan Ellison and Martin Gardner)
Skeptic Vol. 1, No. 2 
Skeptic Vol. 1, No. 3
Skeptic Vol. 1, No. 4
Skeptic Vol. 2, No. 1, "Genius" (with James Randi, Paul MacCready, Marilyn vos Savant, Elie Shneour, and David Alexander) 
Skeptic Vol. 2, No. 2, "The Jesus Cults"
Skeptic Vol. 2, No. 3
Skeptic Vol. 2, No. 4
Skeptic Vol. 3, No. 1
Skeptic Vol. 3, No. 2
Skeptic Vol. 3, No. 3
Skeptic Vol. 3, No. 4
Skeptic Vol. 4, No. 1
Skeptic Vol. 4, No. 2
Skeptic Vol. 4, No. 3
Skeptic Vol. 4, No. 4
Skeptic Vol. 5, No. 1
"An Open Letter from Steve Allen to Heber Jentzsch, President, Church of Scientology"
"But Seriously … Steve Allen Speaks His Mind"
Skeptic Vol. 5, No. 2
Skeptic Vol. 5, No. 3, "Scientology Reply to Steve Allen"
Skeptic Vol. 5, No. 4

References

Discographies of American artists
American filmographies